Bayu is a state constituency in Kedah, Malaysia, that is represented in the Kedah State Legislative Assembly.

Demographics

History

Polling districts 
According to the gazette issued on 30 March 2018, the Bayu constituency has a total of 28 polling districts.

Representation history

Election results

References 

Kedah state constituencies